Jake Picking (born March 2, 1991) is a German-born American actor. He is best known for portraying Rock Hudson in the Netflix series Hollywood (2020), created by Ryan Murphy. He is also known for playing the role of Sean Collier in Patriots Day (2016), and appearing in Top Gun: Maverick (2022). In 2022, he starred as young Gerald Ford in the Showtime series The First Lady.

Biography 
Jake Picking was born in Germany, where his father, a member of the United States Army from West Point, was stationed (though some claim he was born in Massachusetts). He grew up in Wellesley, Massachusetts. At New York University, Picking was a winger on the New York ice hockey team. He dropped out of business school after a year because he was more interested in acting and student film projects. As an ice hockey player, Picking appeared in an NHL commercial before his acting career.

Picking's high school math teacher encouraged him to try out acting, and he took lessons with Carolyn Pickman, a casting agent who also represented Ben Affleck and Matt Damon.

Picking finally began attending auditions in Boston, in 2013 he made his feature film debut with a role in the youth film The Way, Way Back with Steve Carell. This was followed by guest appearances in the series Ironside (2013) and Chasing Life (2014). To start a professional acting career, he moved to Los Angeles, where he initially studied old Hollywood films with stars such as James Dean, Paul Newman, Marlon Brando or Montgomery Clift in his one-room apartment out of loneliness. He preferred moving to the West Coast to a possible acting course at the NYU Tisch School of the Arts, although he had no contacts whatsoever in Los Angeles.

In the next years Picking was regularly in movie productions but mostly subscribed to support roles. In 2016, he was part of the ensemble of the drama Goat, which deals with physical and psychological violence in the American college fraternity landscape. In the role of the sadistic oath master Dixon, Picking tormented Brett, played by Nick Jonas. In the same year he appeared in the thriller Patriots Day, which dramatizes the attack on the Boston Marathon. Here he played the part of policeman Sean Collier, who is shot by the bombers Dzhokhar and Tamerlan Tsarnaev (played by Alex Wolff and Themo Melikidze).

In 2022, Picking appeared in the Top Gun sequel Top Gun: Maverick as Lt. Brigham "Harvard" Lennox.

Filmography

Film

Television

References

External links

1991 births
Living people
American male film actors
American male television actors
American people of German descent
People from Erlangen